Cao Shui born June 5, 1982, also known as Shawn Cao, courtesy name Yaou (Eurasian), pseudonym or hao Lord of Tower of Babel, is a Chinese poet, novelist, screenwriter and translator. He is one of the representative figures of Chinese Contemporary Literature. He leads the great poemism movement. In his Declaration of Great Poem, he aims to integrate sacred and secular cultures, oriental and occidental cultures, ancient and modern cultures in Chinese literature. His most notable works include the Epic of Eurasia, Secret of Heaven (trilogy), and King Peacock (TV series). His works are dedicated to rebuilding a republic in which the whole humanity can live in freedom, which he always described as Eurasia, the Top of the Tower of Babel or Kunlun Mountains (Heaven Mountains). So far twenty books of Cao Shui have been published, including five poem collections, three essay collections, ten novels and one hundred episodes TV series and films. He is a member of China Writers' Association, China Film Association, and China Poetry Society. He is also the editor-in-chief of Great Poem and deputy editor-in-chief of Poetry Weekly. Currently he lives in Beijing as a professional writer and screenwriter.

Life 
Cao Shui was born in Yushe, Shanxi, China. He received his bachelor's degree in Chinese literature at Qinghai University for Nationalities in 2006 and was an international editor of Xihai Metropolis Daily in Xining for two years until he resigned to pursue his desire for personal freedom. After his resignation, Shui traveled around Tibet and Xinjiang, places which he considers the center of both Eurasia or World.

After returning to Xining, he began his professional writing career. In 2017, he moved to Beijing. Until these days in 2018, he has written 7 poem collections, 4 essay collections, 10 novels, 100 episodes for TV, as well as scripts for plays and films. He is currently pursuing a master's degree in the Arts at Beijing Normal University.

He is a member of the China Writers' Association, China Film Association, and China Poetry Society. He is the chief editor of Great Poem and deputy editor in chief of Poetry Weekly, the largest online poetry magazine in the Sinosphere.

Reception 
Cao Shui promotes the Great Poemism movement and is considered one of the leading poets of the Chinese pioneer poem movement. His novels The Secret of Heaven (trilogy) relay the history of human civilization. The trilogy received positive feedback from both critics and readers. He was recommended to Lu Xun Literary Institute, which is regarded as the "cradle of Chinese writers" for Chinese Course and English Course.

Cao Shui's poetry has been translated to multiple languages including English, Japanese, Spanish, Arabic, Turkish, Croatian, Slovene, Korean, Vietnamese, Tibetan, Mongolian, Nuosu, Hungarian, French, Italian, Danish, Russian and Polish. Several of his novels have been adapted into films and TV series. He has also written many screenplays which have been made into dramas, films, and TV series.

Awards 
 Star of Literature in 2011.(首届文学之星）
 The Seventh Qinghai Province Government Literature Award in 2014.（第七届青海省政府文艺奖）
 The first Chinese Youth Poets Award in 2016. （首届中国青年诗人奖）
 China Radio, Film and Television Grand Award in 2015–2016.（中国广播影视大奖）
The fourth Cao Yu Screenplay Prize in 2018.（第四届曹禺杯剧本奖）

Works

Poems 
Who Is Symbolizing in Depression  (，2007).
Cold Lyrics: Lyrics of Eurasia  (，2007).
Great Apocalypse of Yin and Yang of Eurasia  (，2009).
Epic of Eurasia  (汉语诗歌资料馆，2010；， ISBN：9787537854993，2018).
The Lyric of Babel （English, Spanish and Chinese） Translated by Brendan Higginbottom [USA] and Roberto Aedo [Chile] (， ISSN：2225-1499，2018).
The Bride of Hanging Garden of Pamirsberg  (， ISSN：2225-1499，2018).
Grand Dance of Sorrow  (，2019).

Novels 
The Top of the Tower of Babel  (2007).
The Prequel Secret of Heaven: The Top of the Tower of Babel  (ISBN：9787221099334，2012).
The Secret of Heaven I: The Axis of Time  (ISBN：9787221092274, 2010).
The Secret of Heaven II: The Chinese Royal Jade Seal and the Roman Imperial Diamond Crown  (，, 2011).
The Secret of Heaven III: The Tower of Babel Is Mayan Pyramid  (ISBN：9787221131096, 2016).
Legend of Princess Hutai  (ISBN：9787225045771, 2013).
Prince Snow Leopard  (ISBN：978722505297, 2017).
Legend of Prince Yuan He  (ISBN：978-7-225-05610-4, 2018).
The Bride of Tower of Babel (ISBN：9787221099334, 2019).
Bloody Detachment of Women (ISBN：9787221099334, 2019).

Screenplays 
Myth of Kunlun 电视剧《昆仑神话》（TV series，2013）.
Defend China With Blood 纪录片《血铸河山之战马萧萧保河山》（Documentary，2015）.
Prince Snow Leopard 戏剧《雪豹王子》（Play，2016）.
Perfume of Heart 广播剧《心香》（Broadcast Play，2016）.
Prince Hutai：a Legend of Southern Liang Dynasty 纪录片《虎台：一个王朝的背影》（Documentary，2017）.
King Peacock 电视剧《孔雀王》（TV series，2018）.
Death of Poet 电影《海子》（Film，2018）.
Lock and Load 电影《子弹上膛》（Film，2019）
Kung Fu Kid 电影《功夫小鬼》（Film，2019）
Finding Poet Li Po电影《我不是李白》（Film，2019）

Essays 
Sketches of the Top of Tower of Babel  (ISBN： 9787204102594, 2009).
Travel in the Center of Eurasia: Tibet and Xinjiang  (青海人民出版社，2018).
Kekexili Kingdom of Animals （青海民族出版社，ISBN：9787542030757，2018）.

Theories 
Declaration of Greatpoemism   (《大西北诗报》2007第3期).
Great Poetics  (《西风带》2013第1期，2010).
Great Literature Theory: Intertextuality of Poetry, Fiction and Drama   (《中国汉诗》2018第1期).
Poetic Argument Between Cao Shui and Yi Sha (，2019).
Great Poetics: Intertextuality of Poetry, Fiction and Drama (，2019).

Translations 
Steps of Istanbul: Poems of Nurduran Duman《伊斯坦布尔的脚步：纽都然·杜门的诗》(《诗歌周刊》2018年第292期).
Horn of Archangel Metatron：Selected Poems of World《梅塔特隆的号角：世界各国诗选》（类型出版社，2019）

References

External links 
 曹谁新浪博客(Blog of Cao Shui)
 曹谁新浪微博(Webo of Cao Shui)

1982 births
Living people
People's Republic of China poets
Screenwriters from Shanxi
People from Jinzhong
Poets from Shanxi
Chinese male novelists